John Joyce “Jack” Gilligan (March 22, 1921 – August 26, 2013) was an American Democratic politician from the state of Ohio who served as a U.S. Representative and as the 62nd governor of Ohio from 1971 to 1975.  He was the father of Kathleen Sebelius, who later served as governor of Kansas and United States Secretary of Health and Human Services.

Early life
Gilligan was born in Cincinnati, Ohio, the son of Harry Gilligan, a funeral home operator, and his wife, Blanche. His twin sister was Jeanne Joyce Gilligan. His family was Irish Catholic. He graduated from St. Xavier High School in 1939, the University of Notre Dame in 1943 and the University of Cincinnati College of Law in 1947, serving in between in the United States Navy during World War II in the Atlantic, Pacific and Mediterranean as a destroyer gunnery officer.

Career

After the war, Gilligan returned to Cincinnati to teach literature at Xavier University from 1948 to 1953. He also served as member of the Cincinnati city council from 1953 to 1963, and was a candidate for Ohio Congressman-at-Large in 1962. In 1964, he was elected to the Eighty-ninth Congress as a representative for Ohio's 1st district, serving from January 3, 1965 – January 3, 1967. Gilligan narrowly lost his re-election bid to the Ninetieth Congress in 1966 to Republican Robert Taft Jr. after the Republican-controlled Ohio General Assembly redrew his district to favor the Republican Party. In 1968, Gilligan defeated sitting U.S. Senator Frank J. Lausche in the Democratic primary; however, he narrowly lost in the general election to Republican William B. Saxbe after Lausche declined to support him in the general election.

Gilligan won election for governor of Ohio in 1970, defeating Republican state Auditor Roger Cloud, and serving from 1971 to 1975. His signature achievement in office was the creation of Ohio's state income tax. Gilligan lost reelection in the strongly Democratic Watergate year of 1974 to former Republican governor James A. Rhodes (who had been barred from running in 1970 due to term limits) by only 11,488 votes out of 3,072,010 cast. The backlash of big business against Gilligan and in favor of Rhodes was seen by many as the reason for his defeat.

Gilligan subsequently served as the administrator of the United States Agency for International Development (USAID) from 1977 to 1979. In 1980, he was elected to the Common Cause National Governing Board. He served as director of the Institute for Public Policy from 1979 to 1986, and taught at the University of Notre Dame from 1986 to 1992. He also served as director of the civic issues forum at the University of Cincinnati School of Law. In 1999, Gilligan was elected to the Board of Education of the Cincinnati Public Schools. He chose not to stand for re-election when his term expired in 2007.

Family
Gilligan was the father of four children, including Kathleen Sebelius, who served as Governor of Kansas and United States Secretary of Health and Human Services. They became the first father/daughter governor duo in the United States after her election.

Death
Gilligan died at home in Cincinnati on August 26, 2013 at the age of 92. His son said he died of congestive heart failure.

UFO sighting
On October 17, 1973, Gilligan, while governor, claimed to have seen a UFO while driving near Ann Arbor, Michigan. During a press conference he stated: "I saw one (UFO) the other night, so help me. I'm absolutely serious. I saw this."

Legacy
The Gilligan Complex at the Ohio Expo Center and State Fair in Columbus, Ohio, is named in honor of Gilligan.

See also
List of United States representatives from Ohio
List of governors of Ohio

References

External links

John Joyce Gilligan entry at the National Governors Association
 - John Gilligan talks with his daughter, Kathleen Sebelius, about his service during World War II.

1921 births
2013 deaths
20th-century American politicians
Administrators of the United States Agency for International Development
United States Navy personnel of World War II
American people of Irish descent
Catholics from Ohio
Charter Party politicians
Cincinnati City Council members
Democratic Party governors of Ohio
Military personnel from Cincinnati
Politicians from Cincinnati
School board members in Ohio
Democratic Party members of the United States House of Representatives from Ohio
St. Xavier High School (Ohio) alumni
University of Cincinnati College of Law alumni
University of Cincinnati College of Law faculty
University of Notre Dame alumni
United States Navy officers